The Sisterhood: Becoming Nuns is an American reality television series that debuted on Lifetime on 25 November 2014. Written by Eric Evangelista and Shannon Evangelista, the show follows five young women as they visit communities of nuns and religious sisters and discern their religious vocations.

Synopsis 
The Sisterhood: Becoming Nuns follows five young women in their 20s as they visit different communities of women religious– both nuns and religious sisters. Nuns are cloistered and contemplative, meaning they have little contact with the outside world and spend much of their time in prayer. Religious sisters, on the other hand, are active, meaning they work in ministry outside the convent in addition to prayer.

The five young women visit three communities of sisters over the span of the series. The first community was that of the Carmelite Sisters for the Aged and Infirm in Germantown, New York. The second convent visited was home to the Daughters of St. Mary of Providence in Chicago, Illinois. The third and final community visited were the Sisters of St. Joseph the Worker in Walton, Kentucky.

At these communities, the women work in a variety of different ministries, as well as interacting with the sisters and experiencing community life in the convents. The women also have to deal with homesickness, the leaving behind of most of their possessions, as well as quarrels amongst themselves.

Production 
The Sisterhood: Becoming Nuns was written and executive produced by Eric Evangelista and Shannon Evangelista.

Filming was done on site at the convents in Germantown, New York, Chicago, Illinois, and Walton, Kentucky.

Cast 
 Francesca DiPaola, a 21-year-old recent college graduate
 Eseni Ellington, a 23-year-old former aspiring model
 Claire Halbur, a 26-year-old parish music minister
 Stacey Jackson, a 26-year-old musical theatre performer
 Christie Young, a 27-year-old country music band member

Episodes

Reception 

Negative critics included Jo Piazza, who wrote in The Huffington Post that The Sisterhood will "turn nuns into Kardashians," and "is only going to serve to drag their vocation through the mud." The National Catholic Reporter criticized the series' inaccuracy about religious life, calling it a "glorified speed-dating version of a 'Come and See.'"

In addition, the show came to the attention of many nuns and religious sisters themselves. The International Business Times wrote, "For the most part, the show's first episode was met with positive reviews, although some nuns were hesitant about how the show will unfold."

Nancy deWolf Smith of The Wall Street Journal called the series "entertaining but illuminating". Hank Stuever of The Washington Post called the series is "an illuminating exploration of convent life," writing that the show "conducts itself with reverence and curiosity."

References

External links 
 
 

2014 American television series debuts
Lifetime (TV network) original programming
2010s American reality television series